The Peugeot 9X8 is a sports prototype racing car built by French car manufacturer Peugeot for the Le Mans Hypercar category in the FIA World Endurance Championship.

Context
On 13 November 2019, Peugeot announced its return to the WEC and the iconic 24 Hours of Le Mans for 2022 in the new Hypercar category, this debut was subsequently delayed, with Peugeot stating "Team PEUGEOT TotalEnergies’ PEUGEOT 9X8 Hybrid Hypercar will not race at the 2022 24 Hours of Le Mans and will instead make its racing debut in the FIA World Endurance Championship (FIA WEC) this summer". Instead the car made its debut at the 6 Hours of Monza on the 6th of July.

Succeeding the 905 and 908, the 9X8 was designed to take full advantage of the freedoms allowed by the new regulations for the Hypercar category. The first area to benefit from the new regulations is aerodynamics. Indeed, the latter allows the vehicle to have only one adjustable aerodynamic element without specifying what it should be, thus allowing Peugeot to do without the rear spoiler.

Regarding the engine, the 9X8 is equipped with a 680 hp (500 kW) twin-turbo 2.6L V6 mated to a 272 hp (200 kW) electric motor, all assembled in a 7-speed sequential gearbox. Peugeot explains the name "9X8" for several reasons: the 9 symbolizes the brand's high-performance models, the X represents all-wheel drive and electric drive technologies, and the 8 corresponds to the brand's contemporary models.

Peugeot’s on-track testing programme kicked off last December and has since visited Algarve International Circuit, Circuit Paul Ricard, MotorLand Aragón, Circuit de Barcelona-Catalunya and Circuit de Nevers Magny-Cours, with the 9X8 clocking up more than 10,000 kilometres over the course of 25 test days. Paul Di Resta, Loïc Duval, Mikkel Jensen, Gustavo Menezes, James Rossiter and Jean-Éric Vergne were nominated to share the driving duties and form the crews of the two-car entry in 2022 6 Hours of Monza, with the composition of each trio due to be confirmed at a later stage, following the conclusion of the car’s testing programme. The two PEUGEOT 9X8s are then set to contest the remainder of the 2022 FIA World Endurance Championship, including the 2022 6 Hours of Fuji and season finale, the 2022 8 Hours of Bahrain.

Complete World Endurance Championship results
Results in bold indicate pole position. Results in italics indicate fastest lap. Results in (brackets) indicates finishing position in class, while position without brackets indicates overall finishing position

References

9X8
Le Mans Hypercars
24 Hours of Le Mans race cars
Sports prototypes